Mutoscope cards were still images, typically of pin-up material, printed on cards and sold through vending machines. They are not individual pictures from Mutoscope reels and have no connection whatsoever to the Mutoscope motion-picture device. All carry the inscription "A Mutoscope card." They were sold from coin-operated vending machines in places such as amusement parks. Most Mutoscope cards are of pin-up material, but some featured other kinds of images such as Jimmy Hatlo cartoons.

In the literature of cinematography, the phrase "Mutoscope cards" is also used to refer to the individual cards comprising a Mutoscope reel, corresponding to individual frames of the original film from which the reel was produced.

References

Film and video technology